The IMG Academy Junior World Golf Championships are held in San Diego, California, United States each year, currently in July and conducted by the San Diego Junior Golf Association. They include tournaments for six age groups ranging from under-6 to 15–17 and for both boys and girls. Each age group plays at a separate course, ranging from a par-3 course for the youngest to Torrey Pines for the 15–17s, which is also the venue for the Farmers Insurance Open on the PGA Tour and the site of the 2008 U.S. Open.

The event was founded in 1968. The inaugural tournament numbered 475 entrants from 20 U.S. States and six other countries. By 2003 there were 1,040 participants from 43 U.S States and 45 other countries. Qualifying events are held in the U.S. and elsewhere. However, European golf has largely opted out of participation; of around 30 countries that hold qualifying events, not one is in Europe, though a few European compete by other means. In 2005 the top tens of the 15–17 boys' and girls' tournaments featured golfers from ten different countries between them. The most notable trend in the results in recent years is a dramatic increase in the number of wins and top-ten finishes by boys and girls from East Asia. This trend has already translated to LPGA Tour level, but not so much onto the PGA Tour.

Beginning with the 2015 event, IMG Academy became the event's title sponsor. 

Past boys' champions include Notah Begay III, Ernie Els, Phil Mickelson, Corey Pavin, Nick Price, Craig Stadler, David Toms, Jason Day and Tiger Woods. 1984 was a vintage year, with Toms winning the 15–17 event, Els winning the 13–14s (with Mickelson finishing second), and Woods winning the 9–10s (despite still being age 8).

Past girls' champions include Amy Alcott, Brandie Burton, Lorena Ochoa, and Jennifer Rosales.

External links
 Official site

Junior golf tournaments
Golf in California
Sports competitions in San Diego
World championships in golf